Horace White (1865–1943) was an American lawyer and politician from New York

Horace White may also refer to:

Horace White (writer) (1834–1916), American journalist and financial writer
Horace Alton White (1907-1958), American politician from Michigan
Horace Henry White (1864–1946), American lawyer and civic leader from Louisiana